Tina may refer to:

People
Tina (given name), people and fictional characters with the given name Tina

Places
Tina, Iran, a village in Khuzestan Province, Iran
Tina, Tunisia, a town in Sfax Governorate, Tunisia
Tina, Guadalcanal, Solomon Islands
Al-Tina, a Palestinian Arab village depopulated in 1948
Tina, a village in Livezi Commune, Vâlcea County, Romania

United States
Tina, Missouri, a village in Carroll County
Tina, Kentucky, an unincorporated community
Tina, West Virginia, a former settlement

Acronyms
There is no alternative, a political slogan of Margaret Thatcher
This Is Not Art, Newcastle event
TINA, Truth in Advertising (organization), also called TINA.org or truthinadvertising.org
Twisted intercalating nucleic acid

Music
Tina!, a 2008 compilation album by Tina Turner
T.I.N.A. (album), a 2014 album by British-Ghanaian singer-rapper Fuse ODG
Tina (musical), a 2018 jukebox musical

Songs
"T.I.N.A." (song), song by Fuse ODG from album TINA, 2014
"Tina", by The Mekons from Journey to the End of the Night, 2000
"Tina", by Flyleaf, a bonus track on the Japanese release of Flyleaf, 2005 
"Tina", by Camper Van Beethoven from Telephone Free Landslide Victory, 1985
"Tina", by Tyler the Creator from the mixtape Bastard, 2009

Other uses
Tina (plant), genus in the family Sapindaceae
Tina (moth), genus of moths
Tina, slang term for methamphetamine, sometimes used specifically for the smokable form
Tina language, Sambalic language
TINA (program), SPICE based electronics design and training software
A name variant of Tinia, Etruscan god
Tina (film), 2021 documentary film
Tina (magazine), youth magazine in Yugoslavia

See also
Teena (disambiguation)
Thina (disambiguation)